Anarchism is a political theory that is anti-authoritarian. It focuses on the rejection of government, state and societal control, especially through rulers or higher authorities. The anarchist movement continues in Serbia today against the current President Aleksandar Vučić and his government, with protests being held every week against their authority.

History 
On 3 September 2009, six members of the anarcho-syndicalist Serbian IWA section (ASI-MUR), including then-IWA General Secretary Ratibor Trivunac, were arrested on suspicion of international terrorism, a charge which was heavily disputed by the international and other anarchist groups.

Shortly after their arrest, an open letter was circulated by Serbian academics criticizing the charges and the attitude of Serbian police. The six were formally indicted on 7 December and after a lengthy trial procedure Trivunac, along with five other anarchists, were freed on 17 February 2010.

Timeline 

 1906: The newspaper Proleter becomes the first publication to advance anarcho-syndicalist ideas in Serbia.
 1907: There is Serbian attendance at the International Anarchist Congress of Amsterdam.
 1968: Anarchist ideas spread among some students after student protests across Yugoslavia.
 1984: Syndicalist Radomir Radović dies under mysterious circumstances after his advocacy for independent trade unions in Yugoslavia.
 1990s: Anarchists across Yugoslavia are involved in anti-conscription campaigns and are critical of the Yugoslav Wars.
 2002: Neo-nazis assault 2 anarchists.
 2002: The Anarcho-Syndicalist Initiative (ASI) is founded. ASI members claim in 2011 that each year since their founding members are arrested or prosecuted.
 2003: After the assassination of the prime minister, ASI members are suspected by police and see their homes raided, phones and computers confiscated and a member is even arrested.
 2004: The ASI formally joins the IWA-AIT, becoming the ASI-IWA.
 2006: The ASI carries out their first successful union campaign, helping a worker at an Italian restaurant deal with wage theft.
 2007: Members of the ASI-IWA assist student protests against budget cuts at the University of Belgrade. When students occupied the Architecture and Philosophy departments, the dean blamed it on anarcho-syndicalist agitators.
 2009: In response to an attack with Molotov cocktails on the Greek embassy by anarchists, the Serbian state jails 4 members of the ASI-IWA and 2 unrelated anarchists on terrorism charges despite their lack of involvement in the attack.
 2010: The Belgrade Six are acquitted of all charges.
 2011: The ASI-IWA organises protests against NATO during a meeting of NATO members in Belgrade. Protest organisers are subject to police surveillance and harassment.
 2011: An ASI member is arrested for allegedly breaking into a car. The IWA-AIT considers this a fabricated trial and a case of state repression.
 2012: Trials against the Belgrade Six are restarted.
 2013: The ASI-IWA holds the first Balkan anarchs-syndicalist conference in Belgrade, with participants from Bulgaria, Croatia, Kosovo and North Macedonia.
 2013: The ASI-IWA launches a solidarity campaign with Serbian migrant workers in Uruguay.
 2013: The ASI-IWA aids striking public transport workers in Kragujevac who go on strike and blockade nearby roads and railways to protest not being paid for 9 months.
 2015: In response to police harassment of commuters on public transport, the ASI organises protests outside the police headquarters in Belgrade.
 2020: Anarchists are active in the Serbian protests (2020–present).

References 

 
Anarchism by country
Politics of Serbia